Maghull High School is one of three secondary schools in Maghull.

History
The school was produced in 1982 by the merger of Ormonde Drive High School and Old Hall High School on the Ormonde Drive site. By 1988, the Old Hall site was empty. Old Hall High School, opened as Maghull Grammar School, in 1954 with new buildings opening in 1958, it was situated on Old Hall Road. The school was renamed Old Hall High School, in 1972 when it became a comprehensive. Ormonde Drive High School was opened by Lancashire County Council as Ormonde Drive County Secondary School in 1954, as a secondary modern school, it also became comprehensive in 1972.

The school's sixth form academy was originally Woodend Primary School but was later changed to the sixth form after the merger of the two old schools.  the school converted to an academy status.

The Old Hall site is now a housing estate on the opposite side of the A59, covered by the roads Broxholme Way, Aisthorpe Grove, Glentworth Close and Hornby Chase.

In 2017 to 2018 building began on a major re-build of the existing school complex which will see the original 1950's buildings of the former Ormonde Drive High School demolished. The Sixth Form building, O'Kane Centre, Four-storey and adjacent Dave Mercer Way are all expected to be retained. The same year also saw the retirement as Headmaster of Mr Mark Anderson after 14 years, with Ms Davina Aspinall becoming Headmistress.

School Houses
The school houses are Molyneux, Clent, Unsworth and Seel with blue, green, red and yellow as their respective house colours.

The Molyneux house is named after the Molyneux family, who formerly held the Earldom of Sefton until the death of the last Earl in 1972. Unsworth also comes from the name of a former prominent family in the Liverpool area. The history behind Clent and Seel is relatively less well known, although Seel does share the name with a well known street in Liverpool city centre in the Ropewalks area.

Sixth Form
According to the 2014 OFSTED report "Achievement in the sixth form is good and shows an improving trend in both academic and vocational courses. Students achieve particularly well in drama, travel and tourism and media studies." 
The Sixth Form centre is also part of the collaboration project between three of the schools in Sefton along with Deyes High School and Maricourt Catholic High School

Academic Performance
In 2014 a visit from OFSTED reported that at the school "students are supported, encouraged and cared for very well." The report also stated the "students are friendly and welcoming; they treat each other and adults with respect and behave responsibly around the school." Overall the school received a grade 3 "requires improvement" status by OFSTED. site.

GCSE results work out at 78% of entries being A* to D grade with the average result being C. Average GCSE grade in English Language calculated a grade B and English Literature a grade C.

Pastoral Care
The Phoenix Centre mentors work with students to develop resilience and empathy, promote emotional intelligence and literacy and consequently improve emotional well-being and positive mental health. They help pupils of all ages and abilities achieve to their potential, identify strategies to overcome their individual barriers to learning, while raising aspirations and promoting positive relationships.
Working with students on a one-to-one basis and in groups they help to overcome many barriers which include attendance, behaviour, communication, friendships, self-esteem, organisation, confidence, bullying, bereavement, family issues, medical/physical, emotional and many more.

Notable former pupils

Maghull High School
 Alex Curran 
 Ryan Ledson
 Connor Randall
 Calum Dyson

Maghull Grammar School
 Keith Ely, Editor from 1989-95 of the Liverpool Daily Post 
 Prof Steve Young FREng, Professor of Information Engineering since 1995 at the University of Cambridge, and winner of the 2015 IEEE James L. Flanagan Speech and Audio Processing Award

Ormonde Drive High School
 Mark Hateley

Ormonde Drive Secondary Modern
 Eddie Hemings

References

External links
 School Website
 EduBase
 

1982 establishments in England
Academies in the Metropolitan Borough of Sefton
Educational institutions established in 1982
Secondary schools in the Metropolitan Borough of Sefton
Maghull